The 2008 Paris–Tours was the 102nd edition of the Paris–Tours cycle race and was held on 12 October 2008. The race started in Saint-Arnoult-en-Yvelines and finished in Tours. The race was won by Philippe Gilbert of the Française des Jeux team.

General classification

References

2008 in French sport
2008